Paul Lea (born February 19, 1929, Breckenridge, Texas; died May 19, 2009, Raton, New Mexico) was an American football player and physician.

Lea played college football at Tulane University, where he was an offensive and defensive tackle.  He was a first-team all-Southeastern Conference selection from 1948–50, and was named to the 1948 College Football All-America Team as a sophomore.

Lea was drafted by the Chicago Bears in the seventh round of the 1951 NFL Draft.  The Bears traded him to the Pittsburgh Steelers, for whom he appeared in nine games in the 1951 season.  He also played for the Calgary Stampeders of the Canadian Football League.

After his football career, Lea returned to New Orleans and graduated from Tulane Medical School.  He became an anesthesiologist and was director of anesthesia at Methodist Hospital in eastern New Orleans for 30 years.  After Hurricane Katrina destroyed his New Orleans home in 2005, he moved to Gunnison, Colorado.  He died on May 19, 2009, while traveling to Gunnison.

External links

References

1929 births
2009 deaths
Physicians from Louisiana
American anesthesiologists
Tulane Green Wave football players
Pittsburgh Steelers players
Calgary Stampeders players
People from Breckenridge, Texas
People from Gunnison, Colorado